The Million Worker March was a rally against perceived attacks upon working families in America and what organizers described as millions of jobs lost during the Bush administration with the complicity of the Congress of the United States.

The Million Worker March took place on October 17, 2004 in Washington, D.C. An estimated 10,000 demonstrators spent the day on the steps of the Lincoln Memorial listening to speeches and discussing various issues. Organizers presented an array of demands from better wages to an end to the war in Iraq.

Standing where his father gave his "I have a dream" speech, Martin Luther King III told the crowd that civil rights, workers and anti-war activists must come together in common cause.

Organization and support
The Million Worker March was primarily organized by the International Longshore and Warehouse Union. Although the ILWU was affiliated with the AFL–CIO and the Canadian Labour Congress, neither national trade union officially endorsed the rally.

Based on local union endorsements, organizers estimated that they were representing about 3.5 million workers.

A diverse group of organizations supported the Million Worker March.  Global Exchange and the Rainforest Action Network backed the demonstration. The rally also garnered backing from many celebrities like Coretta Scott King, Danny Glover, Jesse Jackson and Chumbawamba.

Demands
Organizers called for universal health care, a national living wage, guaranteed pensions for all working people, an end to the outsourcing of jobs overseas, a repeal of the Patriot Act, increased funding for public education, free mass transit in every city, a reduction of the military budget and cancellation of pro-corporation pacts.

Participants
The movement invited all working-class people to come to Washington, D.C. The leaders claimed a sense of urgency to solve problems that plagued working families immediately instead of idly waiting for the end of the George W. Bush administration. Many participants carried signs with slogans like, "Bush lied, thousands died" and "More money for jobs, not war".

See also

 Labor movement
 UNITE HERE
 List of protest marches on Washington, D.C.

References

External links
 Million Worker March Movement
 Sinkers.org video
 Archive.org snapshot of antiwar4themillionworkermarch.org site from October 11, 2004
 The Million Worker March: Black People Did Not Get the Vote by Voting An Interview with Clarence Thomas (ILWU Local 10), Co-Chair of the Million Worker March
 Workers Preparing To Rally On Mall By Manny Fernandez, Washington Post, Thursday, October 14, 2004

2004 protests
2004 in Washington, D.C.
October 2004 events in the United States
Protest marches in Washington, D.C.
Labor movement in the United States